Ben Wicks,  (born Alfred Wicks; October 1, 1926 – September 10, 2000) was a British-born Canadian cartoonist, illustrator, journalist and author.

Biography
Wicks was a Cockney born into a poor, working-class family in London's East End near London Bridge. He learned to play the saxophone in the British Army and toured Europe in a band with author Leonard Bigg also from London. He immigrated to Canada in 1957 with his wife Doreen Wicks with just $25. He found work as a milkman in Calgary and then joined the Canadian Army as a musician and began studying cartooning from books. Wicks came across a list in a library of magazines willing to purchase cartoons and began trying his hand—his first major success was being published by the Saturday Evening Post.

In 1963, he travelled to Toronto to assess cartooning possibilities and met Toronto Telegram 'The Giants' daily illustrated feature cartoonist, Norman Drew, who advised him to move to Toronto. Wicks then moved to Toronto to work for the Toronto Telegram and his cartoon, The Outcasts, was soon syndicated in over 50 newspapers. His cartoons were simply drawn but were very topical and witty and became popular with readers and were picked up by the Toronto Star after the Telegram ceased operations in 1971. At its height, his daily cartoon, now called Wicks was carried by 84 Canadian and more than 100 American newspapers.

Wicks had a self-effacing but charming personality and became a popular guest on television and radio shows and had his own television show on the Canadian Broadcasting Corporation in the 1970s. He also created and illustrated the Katie and Orbie series of children's books written by his daughter Susan which in 1994 were turned into an animated series for Family in Canada and for PBS in the United States.

Canada Games published a board game in collaboration with Ben called "Quick Picks With Ben Wicks" which is similar in game play to Pictionary.

He also opened a pub in Toronto's Cabbagetown district named The Ben Wicks. The Parliament Street pub was sold to new owners July 2013. However, a blue plaque commemorating Wicks has been installed on the railing and a wall-sized outdoor cartoon by Wicks has been retained.

Wicks was also known for his humanitarian work. He used his illustrations to publicize the plight of civilian sufferers of the Biafran War in Nigeria, and became a supporter of Oxfam. During the 1984–1985 famine in Ethiopia, he organized Cartoonists for Africa raising money and awareness. Wicks spent much time in his later decades promoting literacy among children.

In 1986, he was made a Member of the Order of Canada.

In 1997, he donated material to the Ryerson University archives.

Wicks died of cancer in 2000 at age 73.

In Wicks' memory, the annual  "Ben Wicks Award" was given from 2001 to 2010 to young talented cartoonists by Regional Maple Leaf Communications.

In May 2007, Wicks was the subject of a court case, as his children tried to reclaim 2,408 vintage drawings left behind in a 1992 move. The family won the case and the court ordered the drawings to be returned to them.

Works
 Waiting for the All Clear, Bloomsbury, London, 1990, 
 No Time to Wave Goodbye, Stoddart, Toronto, 1988, 
 Katie and Orbie Save the Planet, 1991 (as illustrator), 
 The Day They Took the Children, Stoddart, Toronto,1989, 
 DAWN OF THE PROMISED LAND, The Creation of Israel, Stoddart,1997,

References 

Canadian comic strip cartoonists
1926 births
2000 deaths
English emigrants to Canada
Members of the Order of Canada
People from the City of London
English expatriates in Canada